Zimbabwe boasts several tourist attractions, located in almost every region of the country. Before the economic changes, much of the tourism for these locations came to the Zimbabwean side but now Zambia benefits from the tourism. The Victoria Falls National Park is also a tourist attraction and is one of the eight main National Parks in Zimbabwe, largest of which is Hwange National Park. Zimbabwe is home to one of the Seven Natural Wonders of the World, the Victoria Falls, an attraction that pulls thousands of visitors for the famous Victoria Falls tour.

The Eastern Highlands are a series of mountainous areas near the border with Mozambique. These highlands stretch from Nyanga in the north with the highest peak in Zimbabwe, Mount Nyangani at 2593 metres is located here as well with the Bvumba Mountains 
further south and the magnificent quartzite Chimanimani range are the southernmost slopes. Mt. Binga is the highest of the Chimanimani peaks. It straddles both Mozambique and Zimbabwe. The endemic species of this transfrontier park attract scientists and hikers from all over the world. Views from all of the Nyanga mountains are famed that places as far away as 60–70 km are visible and, on clear days, the town of Rusape can be seen.

Zimbabwe is distinctive in Africa for its large number of medieval era city ruins built in a unique dry stone style. Possibly the most famous of these are the Great Zimbabwe ruins in Masvingo which survive from the Kingdom of Zimbabwe era. Other ruins include Khami Ruins, Zimbabwe, Dhlo-Dhlo and Naletale.

The Matobo Hills are an area of granite kopjes and wooded valleys commencing some 35 kilometres south of Bulawayo, southern Zimbabwe.  The Hills were formed over 2000 million years ago with granite being forced to the surface, this has eroded to produce smooth "whaleback dwalas" and broken kopjes, strewn with boulders and interspersed with thickets of vegetation. Mzilikazi, founder of the Ndebele nation, gave the area its name, meaning 'Bald Heads'. They have become famous and a tourist attraction because Cecil John Rhodes famous for his vision that led to foundation of Rhodesia, and other early white pioneers like Leander Starr Jameson, Major Allan Wilson, and most of the members of the Shangani Patrol are buried in these hills at another site named World's View.

Hwange National Park and Mana Pools, a UNESCO World Heritage site, are some of the best National Parks and safari destinations in the region. The tourism sector in Zimbabwe has been on the rise for past 2 years.

The deployment of widespread police roadblocks issuing fines for minor or non-existent infringements has had a negative impact on tourism to the country.

Arrivals by country

In previous years, most visitors arriving to Zimbabwe on short-term basis were from the following countries of nationality:

References

 
Zimbabwe